Salerne is a red wine grape.

Salerne may also refer to:
 John Salerne (disambiguation)
 Gismund of Salerne

See also

 Salernes, a commune in the Var department, Provence-Alpes-Côte d'Azur, France
 Salerno (disambiguation)